David Latta may refer to:

David Latta (politician) (1869–1948), politician from Alberta, Canada
David Latta (ice hockey) (born 1967), ice hockey player in the National Hockey League